Local elections in Serbia were held on 3 April 2022 in the municipalities of Aranđelovac, Bajina Bašta, Belgrade, Bor, Doljevac, Kladovo, Knjaževac, Kula, Lučani, Majdanpek, Medveđa, Sečanj, Sevojno, and Smederevska Palanka. Alongside the local elections, national-level general elections were held simultaneously on the same day.

Seven ballot lists appeared in the election in Aranđelovac, while nine ballot lists appeared in Bajina Bašta. In Belgrade, there were twelve ballot lists in total; the Serbian Progressive Party (SNS) nominated Aleksandar Šapić as their mayoral candidate, while the major opposition United for the Victory of Serbia (UZPS) coalition nominated Vladeta Janković. In Bor, eleven ballot lists were present in total while parties inside the UZPS coalition ran on two separate ballot lists. Four ballot lists were present in the election in Doljevac, with no opposition parties taking part in the local election. In Kladovo, five lists appeared on the ballot, while in Knjaževac there were eight lists in total. The UZPS coalition also ran on two separate lists in Kula, where the leader of a civic group claimed that bribery occurred during the collection of signatures. Five ballot lists appeared in the election in Lučani and seven in Majdanpek, where electoral irregularities were reported at voting stations. Seven ballot lists appeared in the election in Medveđa, while in Sečanj there were four lists on the ballot. In Sevojno, six lists appeared on the ballot, while in Smederevska Palanka there were seven lists in total, with the UZPS coalition again running on two separate lists.

SNS won the most votes in all local elections. In Belgrade, the election was repeated at five voting stations on 16 April and again on 21 April due to the UZPS coalition and Social Democratic Party (SDS) objecting the results at those polling stations. SDS did not manage to cross the threshold after the repeat elections, and in June, Šapić was elected mayor of Belgrade.

Background 
Previous local elections in Serbia were held in March and October 2021, in which the ruling Serbian Progressive Party (SNS) won a majority of seats in most of the municipalities. Electoral irregularities had occurred at voting stations, and there had also been physical attacks on opposition activists. Dialogues between the opposition and ruling parties regarding electoral conditions were held from May to October 2021. The two groups signed a document on 29 October, which included changes to the required minimum of collected signatures for minority ballots and changes to the composition of the Regulatory Body of Electronic Media (REM) and Republic Electoral Commission (RIK). The environmental protests, which began in September 2021, grew in size due to the adoption of modifications to the law on referendum and people's initiative and the expropriation law in November 2021. The modifications to the law on referendums and people's initiatives abolished the 50% threshold that was needed for referendums to pass into law. The protests lasted until February 2022. In Belgrade, the protests helped the We Must coalition to gain more support in opinion polls. A constitutional referendum regarding the judiciary also took place in January 2022, in which the "yes" option, which was supported by the government, prevailed over the "no" option, although the turnout was reported to be at 30 per cent.

Electoral system 
Local elections in Serbia are held under a proportional representation system. Shortly prior to the election, parties must submit a ballot list with its candidates and their ballot leader; voters then vote for an entire ballot list, rather than for an individual candidate. After the election, elected members vote to elect a mayor or the president of a municipality. To cross the electoral threshold and be represented in the local assembly, ballot lists must receive at least 3% of the popular vote, while 40% of the ballot candidates must be female. One mandate of a mayor, president of a municipality, or an elected member of a local assembly lasts four years.

Results and campaign 
Ivica Dačić, the president of the National Assembly, called the local elections on 15 February, and shortly afterwards Aleksandar Vučić, the president of Serbia, dissolved the National Assembly, after which the official electoral campaign began. Dačić announced that local elections would be held in the municipalities of Aranđelovac, Bajina Bašta, Belgrade, Bor, Doljevac, Kladovo, Knjaževac, Kula, Lučani, Majdanpek, Medveđa, Sečanj, Sevojno, and Smederevska Palanka. The 2022 general election occurred simultaneously on 3 April.

Aranđelovac 
On 16 February, SNS submitted their ballot list for the election, and a day later, the Serbian Party Oathkeepers (SSZ) submitted their ballot list. The Socialist Party of Serbia (SPS)–United Serbia (JS) coalition submitted their ballot on 18 February. POKS submitted its list on 21 February, while the Dveri–Healthy Serbia (ZS) coalition submitted its ballot later that day. The United Serbia (US) coalition list and Enough is Enough (DJB) list were later confirmed by the City Election Commission. During the campaign period, SNS youth representatives launched an initiative to landscape the area near a local railway station. SPS representatives signed an agreement with the Greens of Serbia on 25 February, which formalised their coalition in Aranđelovac.

In the municipality of Aranđelovac, there were 36,847 eligible citizens that were able to vote in the local election. The local City Election Commission reported that the turnout was 63%. The Serbian Progressive Party won 19 seats, while the SPS–JS coalition won seven. The Serbian Party Oathkeepers won 5 seats, while the United Serbia coalition won four, and the Dveri–ZS coalition won three seats. Two seats were won by POKS, while the Enough is Enough party won one.

Bajina Bašta 
The SNS-led coalition submitted their ballot list on 17 February, while the SPS–JS coalition submitted its ballot on 23 February. The Social Democratic Party (SDS) submitted its ballot list on 8 March, and on the same day, the People's Party (NS) and Democratic Party (DS) had also submitted their list under the "United for Victory" banner. ZS had also submitted their list on 12 March, and a day later, the National Democratic Alternative (NADA) list was confirmed. The civic group "Loud and Clear", which was led by Vladislav Biljić, submitted their ballot on 13 March. A day later, the City Election Commission confirmed the Alliance 90/Greens of Serbia list.

In the municipality of Bajina Bašta, there were 21,733 eligible citizens that were able to vote in the local election. The local City Election Commission reported that the turnout was 68%. The coalition led by the Serbian Progressive Party won 24 seats, while the United Serbia coalition won 9 seats. The SPS–JS coalition won six seats, and it is followed by the Healthy Serbia which won three seats, the Social Democratic Party which won two seats, and Dveri, which won one seat. NS had claimed that they allegedly stopped electoral fraud from taking place at voting stations.

Belgrade 

The City of Belgrade announced that the SNS–led coalition, SPS–led coalition, Serbian Radical Party (SRS), SSZ, UZPS, NADA, We Must (Moramo), SDS–led coalition, Love, Faith, Hope (LJVN), Sovereignists, Dveri, and the Russian Minority Alliance would take part in the local election. SNS nominated Aleksandar Šapić as their mayoral candidate, while UZPS nominated Vladeta Janković.

In Belgrade, preliminary results were published a day after the elections, although due to objections that were made by UZPS and SDS the election was repeated at five voting stations on 16 April and again on 21 April. Final results were published on 9 May. Opposition parties had managed to win more votes than the governing parties, although SDS remained below the threshold. Opposition parties suggested that the next election might be called earlier. Šapić was shortly after elected as mayor of Belgrade.

Bor 
The Bor City Election Commission (GIK) proclaimed the ballot list led by SNS on 16 February. A day later, the Party of Freedom and Justice (SSP) held a conference during which the party presented a coalition with the Movement of Free Citizens (PSG), Vlach Party, and Regional Development Initiative of East Serbia, and the coalition appointed Ljubiša Stamenković, an independent politician, as their ballot representative. The SPS–JS coalition presented its ballot on 18 February, while the Vlach Party "Bridge" announced that they will contest the local election by themselves. GIK proclaimed the Dveri–POKS ballot list on 19 February, and the coalition led by the NS on 20 February. The Sovereignists coalition, which was led by the Enough is Enough party, submitted its ballot on 25 February. In Bor, JS decided to not participate in a coalition with SPS and its ballot was submitted on 4 March. Two civic groups, the "Loud for the Youth" and "Fighters for Bor", submitted their ballots on 7 March. The Serbian Radical Party (SRS) and Russian Party (RS) had also announced their participation in the election; SRS managed to submit its list before the deadline.

During the campaign, the NS–led coalition stated its support for building new hospitals and its opposition to exploitation of natural resources. The Vlach Party "Bridge" representatives proposed that salaries at the Serbia Zijin Bor Copper, a copper mining complex, should be increased instead, while SRS stated its support for exploitation. A poll was conducted in early February, in which the majority of respondents stated that the local government in Bor should change. SNS received its support from the Social Democratic Party of Serbia (SDPS) and the Movement of Vlachs of Serbia (PVS). The "Loud for Youth" civic group campaigned mainly on youth politics.

In the municipality of Bor, there were 40,661 eligible citizens that were able to vote in the local election. The local City Election Commission stated that the turnout was 61.2%. The Serbian Progressive Party won 15 seats, while the coalition led by the People's Party won 6 seats. The Socialist Party of Serbia and Vlach Party "Bridge" both won four seats, while the coalition led by the Party of Freedom and Justice won three seats. The Dveri–POKS coalition, Fighters for Bor, and Loud for the Youth each won one seat.

Doljevac 
The City Election Commission in Doljevac had confirmed four ballot lists in total, which were SNS, SPS, JS, and SRS. It was noted that opposition parties would not take part in the local election in Doljevac. In the municipality of Doljevac, there were 13,940 eligible citizens that were able to vote in the local election. The local City Election Commission reported that the turnout is reported to be at 78%. The Serbian Progressive Party won a supermajority of 30 seats, while the Socialist Party of Serbia and United Serbia have each won three seats, while the Serbian Radical Party only won one seat.

Kladovo 
The SNS list was confirmed by the City Election Commission on 16 February, while the SPS list was confirmed two days later. On 4 March, the Vlach National Party ballot list was confirmed. A civic group named "Movement for Kladovo – dr Borislav Petrović" also announced its participation in the election, and its list was confirmed by the City Election Commission on 11 March. A ballot list led by SRS was confirmed before the deadline.

In the municipality of Kladovo, there were 21,668 eligible citizens that were able to vote in the local election. The local City Election Commission stated that the turnout was 52%. The Serbian Progressive Party won 14 seats and followed by them, the Movement for Kladovo won 9 seats, and the Socialist Party of Serbia won 5 seats.

Knjaževac 
In Knjaževac, the local City Election Commission confirmed the SNS ballot list on 16 February, while the SPS list was confirmed on 19 February. The NADA ballot list was confirmed on 1 March, while the US coalition and SRS ballot lists were confirmed a day later. The Dveri–POKS coalition submitted its ballot on 3 March, and it was confirmed by the City Election Commission on the same day. The City Election Commission also confirmed ballot lists that were submitted by the Serbian People's Party (SNP) and JS.

In the municipality of Knjaževac, there were 23,638 eligible citizens that were able to vote in the local election. The local City Election Commission reported that the turnout was 63%. The Serbian Progressive Party won 27 seats and followed by them, the Socialist Party of Serbia won 6 seats, the United Serbia coalition won 4 seats, the Dveri–POKS coalition won two seats, and the National Democratic Alternative won one seat.

Kula 
SNS submitted its list on 16 February. SPS and "List of the Serb Community" submitted their list shortly after. A coalition list made up of DJB, NS, and RS was formed, and its ballot list was confirmed by 14 March, including SRS and a civic group named "Citizens of Kula and Our City". Zlatko Ostojić, the leader of the civic group "Citizens of Kula and Our City", had claimed that two ballot lists were submitted in an illegal way, and that bribery took place during the collection of signatures.

In the municipality of Kula, there were 34,198 eligible citizens that were able to vote in the local election. The local City Election Commission reported that the turnout was 65%. The Serbian Progressive Party won 21 seats and followed by them, the Critical Mass – for the Victory and Citizens of Kula and Our City each won five seats, List of the Serb Community and Socialist Party of Serbia have each won three seats, and the coalition led by the People's Party won two seats.

Lučani 
Milivoje Dolović was chosen as the ballot representative of the SNS-led list which was proclaimed on 17 February. The SPS–JS coalition's list was confirmed on 21 February. In early March, the City Election Commission confirmed the ballot list led by POKS. A civic group named "One Team" also announced its participation in the election, and its ballot list was confirmed by 14 March, including SRS. In the previous local election, Lučani was noted as a municipality with a high amount of blackmail and pressure towards the voters, although local citizens noted that this did not occur during the electoral campaign period in March 2022.

In the municipality of Lučani, there were 15,414 eligible citizens that were able to vote in the local election. The local City Election Commission stated that the turnout was 72%. The Serbian Progressive Party won 20 seats and followed by them, One Team won 9 seats, the SPS–JS coalition won four seats, and POKS won two seats.

Majdanpek 
The local City Election Commission confirmed the SNS ballot list on 16 February, while the SPS list was confirmed on 22 February. The civic group "It can be different" ballot list was confirmed on 25 February. On 12 March, the ballot list led by Dveri was confirmed by the City Election Commission, and two days later, ballot lists led by SRS, NADA, and a civic group "I don't give up!" were confirmed. Besides them, the Vlach Party and Vlach Party "Bridge" had also announced their participation in the election, although their ballot lists were not confirmed by the City Election Commission.

In the municipality of Majdanpek, there were 16,251 eligible citizens that were able to vote in the local election. Electoral irregularities were reported to have occurred at voting stations. The local City Election Commission reported that the turnout was 59%. The Serbian Progressive Party won 19 seats and followed by them, the SPS–JS coalition won 5 seats, "I don't give up" won three seats, "It can be different" won two seats, and Dveri and NADA won one seat respectively.

Medveđa 
The SNS ballot list was confirmed by GIK on 16 February, being the first one to submit a ballot in Medveđa. In early March, it held a campaign rally in the town. Six more ballot lists were confirmed by 14 March, after an announcement from the City Election Commission in Medveđa.

In the municipality of Medveđa, there were 6,175 eligible citizens that were able to vote in the local election. The local City Election Commission stated that the turnout was 64%. The Serbian Progressive Party won 13 seats and followed by them, "Medveđa has better" won 5 seats, the Socialist Party of Serbia won three seats, the Democratic Party "For Medveđa" won two seats, the Party for Democratic Action and For the Development of Medveđa each won one seat.

Sečanj 
SNS submitted its list on 17 February, while the SPS ballot list was confirmed on 19 February. An opposition civic group named "For the better Municipality of Sečanj", which was led by Vukašin Baćina, announced its participation in the election on 21 February, and its ballot list was confirmed on 28 February. SRS also announced its participation in the election, and its ballot list was confirmed in early March. Baćina was arrested on 1 March, with the police claiming that his arrest occurred because of alleged bribery that took place in February 2022.

In the municipality of Sečanj, there were 10,481 eligible citizens that were able to vote in the local election. The local City Election Commission stated that the turnout was 67%. According to the results, the Serbian Progressive Party won 15 seats and followed by them, the SPS–JS coalition won 6 seats, and the For the better Municipality of Sečanj won two seats.

Sevojno 
The SNS-led coalition in Sevojno formed a coalition with SPS, and their ballot was confirmed by GIK on 18 February. Healthy Serbia (ZS) submitted its ballot on 20 February. In early March, the SRS ballot list was proclaimed. The US coalition had also announced its participation in the local election, and its ballot list was confirmed on 8 March. The SSZ ballot list was confirmed on the same day. By 15 March, the JS ballot list was also confirmed by the City Election Commission. During the electoral campaign, SNS announced that the reconstruction of the ambulance building would begin in April. Avram Ilić, a Healthy Serbia representative, stated that "further decentralization would be necessary for a better life of the citizens in Sevojno".

In the municipality of Sevojno, there were 5,681 eligible citizens that were able to vote in the local election. The local City Election Commission reported that the turnout was 70%. The Serbian Progressive Party won 10 seats and followed by them, the Healthy Serbia won 4 seats, while the United Serbia coalition won 2 seats and other parties managed to cross the threshold.

Smederevska Palanka 
In Smederevska Palanka, GIK confirmed the SNS ballot list on 16 February. It confirmed the SPS–JS list on 18 February, and on the same day, it also proclaimed the list led by NS. On 5 March, the SRS ballot list was confirmed, and a day later the NS ballot list was proclaimed by the City Election Commission. On 11 March, the People's Front and ZS ballot lists were confirmed. SSP stated in early March that their ballot list was declined by the City Election Commission, with the president of the City Election Commission stating that the commission does not have a quorum. Its ballot list was confirmed later on 6 March. 

In the municipality of Smederevska Palanka, there were 39,932 eligible citizens that were able to vote in the local election. The local City Election Commission reported that the turnout was 58%. According to the results, the Serbian Progressive Party won 34 seats and followed by them, the coalition around the Party of Freedom and Justice, SPS–JS coalition, and the People's Party have won 4 seats, the Healthy Serbia won two seats, and the People's Front won one seat.

Aftermath 
In Sečanj, Vukašin Baćina and his citizens group declined to join the local government led by Serbian Progressive Party. Vesna Đurić, who previously served as the president of the municipality of Bajina Bašta, was sworn in on 12 May; all 24 members of the Serbian Progressive Party city assembly group voted in favour. On the same day, Damjan Miljanić was chosen as the president of the municipality of Kula. A day later, Serbian Progressive Party formed a local government in Lučani together with the Socialist Party of Serbia.

References 

2022 elections in Serbia
2022 in Serbia
Local elections in Serbia